Stefan Gartenmann (born 2 February 1997) is a Danish professional footballer who plays as a centre-back for Danish Superliga club FC Midtjylland.

Club career

Heerenveen
Gartenmann moved from the youth academy of FC Roskilde to Dutch club SC Heerenveen in July 2013 – Roskilde's first transfer to a club outside of Denmark – and he initially became a part of the youth teams of the Frisian club. 24 August 2015, Gartenmann made his first appearance as a second-half substitute in the reserves of Heerenveen in a 2–0 win in the Beloften Eredivisie over ADO Den Haag. On 14 September, he scored his first goal for the second team of Heerenveen in a 1–1 draw against the PEC Zwolle reserves with the goal to secure the final score.

Gartenmann signed his first professional contract on 26 October 2015, a three-year contract. However, during his time with the club he did not manage to make an appearance for the senior team in the Eredivisie.

SønderjyskE
On 5 May 2017, it was announced that Gartenmann would return to Denmark for the 2017–18 season, as he had joined the Danish Superliga club SønderjyskE on a three-year contract. On 7 August 2017, he made his professional debut when he came on as a late substitute for Troels Kløve in a 3–0 win on matchday two of the regular season against AGF. He scored his first goal for SønderjyskE on 28 November 2017 in a 4–1 victory in the round of 16 of the Danish Cup competition against third-tier Danish 2nd Division club Jammerbugt.

On 1 July 2020, Gartenmann was part of the SønderjyskE team winning the 2019–20 Danish Cup by beating AaB in a 2–0 win. The win marked the first trophy in club history. In May 2022 it was confirmed, that Gartenmann would leave the club, as his contract was expiring.

Midtjylland
On 28 June 2022 it was confirmed, that FC Midtjylland had signed Gartenmann on a free transfer, with the player signing a deal until June 2025.

International career
On 2 October 2012, Gartenmann played for the first time for the Denmark under-16 team in a 4–2 win in a test match in Lhota, Kladno against the Czech Republic. He was used in nine games at under-16 level. On 5 August 2013, he gained his first of eleven total caps for Denmark at under-17 level in a 4–0 win during a tournament in Norway against Sweden. After he was not used for Denmark under-18, Gartenmann finally appeared in his first game for the Denmark under-19 on 4 September 2014 in a 2–1 win in the friendly against Norway in Lyngdal. In this game he scored his first goal for this age group with the goal to 2–0. The qualification for the 2016 UEFA European Under-19 Championship was missed; Gartenmann played his last game on 15 November 2015 in a goalless draw in the European Championship qualifier against Israel in Hamrun, Malta. On 7 October 2017, Gartenmann played his last of six games for the under-20 team, in a 2–2 draw in a friendly against Sweden in Södra Sandby.

Honours
SønderjyskE
Danish Cup: 2019–20

References

External links
Profile at the FC Midtjylland website

1997 births
People from Roskilde
Living people
Danish men's footballers
Danish expatriate men's footballers
Denmark youth international footballers
FC Roskilde players
SC Heerenveen players
SønderjyskE Fodbold players
FC Midtjylland players
Danish Superliga players
Danish expatriate sportspeople in the Netherlands
Expatriate footballers in the Netherlands
Association football defenders
Denmark under-21 international footballers
Sportspeople from Region Zealand
Danish people of Swiss descent